Neilburg is a village in the Canadian province of Saskatchewan within the Rural Municipality of Hillsdale No. 440 and Census Division No. 13. A grade K–12 school is located in the village that services the Neilburg area as well as grade 7–12 students from Marsden. 

Neilburg was named after an early settler, Clifford O’Neil. The first post office was in his home and was located about one mile south-east of where the village is today. Neilburg was established as a hamlet in 1923 and by 1946, it had grown big enough to be incorporated as the village of Neilburg.

The village is about 6 kilometres away from the north-east corner of Manitou Lake. On the north-west corner of the lake is Big Manitou Regional Park.

History 
Neilburg incorporated as a village on January 1, 1947.

In 1999 crop circles were discovered in a field near the village.

Demographics 

References

Villages in Saskatchewan
Hillsdale No. 440, Saskatchewan
Division No. 13, Saskatchewan